HLA-DR2 (DR2) of the HLA-DR serotype system, is a broad antigen serotype that is now preferentially covered by HLA-DR15 and HLA-DR16 serotype group. This serotype primarily recognizes gene products of the HLA-DRB1*15 and HLA-DRB1*16 allele groups.

Serology

Disease associations
DR2 serotypes are associated with Goodpasture syndrome, systemic lupus erythematosus, multiple sclerosis, and narcolepsy, tuberculoid leprosy (multi-drug-resistant tuberculosis or leprosy), ulcerative colitis(Japanese), primary biliary cirrhosis and autoimmune hepatitis. DR2 is also found in all patients that test positive for anti-anti-Asn-RNA-synthetase and chronic interstitial lung disease.

Genetic linkage
DR2 is linked to the HLA-DR51.

References

2